Krongpol Daorueang (born 18 April 1978) is a Thai former footballer who is last known to have lined up for Balestier Central of the Singapore S.League in 2001.

Club career

Balestier Central
Moving to Balestier Central of the Singaporean S.League in 2001 following a one-week trial, Krongpol settled into the country well, sharing an apartment with teammates Josip Kozic and Fabio da Silva and putting in good displays for the club.

Personal life
Throughout his days in Singapore, the Thai attacker was known for his cooking ability and succulent dishes, planning to open a restaurant in the near future.

References 

Krongpol Daorueang
Thai expatriate footballers
Association football midfielders
Krongpol Daorueang
Association football forwards
Expatriate footballers in Singapore
Balestier Khalsa FC players
Singapore Premier League players
Living people
1975 births